Stefanie "Steffi" Sieger (born 9 March 1988 in Berchtesgaden) is a German luger who has competed since 1999. She finished 12th in the 2008-09 Luge World Cup.

References

External links
http://www.rennrodeln.info/aktive/sieger_steffi.php

German female lugers
1988 births
Living people
People from Berchtesgaden
Sportspeople from Upper Bavaria